Raise.com is an e-commerce platform owned and operated by Raise that enables third-party sellers to sell new or used Gift Cards on a fixed-price online marketplace alongside Raise's regular offerings. The company is based in Chicago, Illinois, and was launched in 2013 by founder George Bousis, who still remains the Executive Chairman today alongside CEO Jay Klauminzer.

History 
Raise.com was initially conceived as a spinoff of another service created by Bousis and Bradley Wasz, called CouponTrade, which was founded in 2010.

Since that time, the marketplace became more amenable to Bousis's idea. As stated by Crain's Chicago Business column, "a 2009 federal law prevented gift cards from expiring for five years; cards went from a magnetic stripe to all-digital in 2010; and advances in mobile technology made it possible to buy and sell cards on a smartphone."

Founded in 2013, Raise.com received $18 million in Series A funding from Bessemer Venture Funding. A second round of funding in 2015 saw $56M in Series B funding from New Enterprise Associates.

In August 2015, Raise.com acquired Tastebud Technologies for an undisclosed amount. Its CEO, Tyler Spalding, took the Chief Strategy Officer role within Raise.com.

In June 2016, Raise acquired Slide for an undisclosed amount in stock, a company which allows people to store your gift cards in a digital wallet/passbook. Raise also announced plans to open a New York office.

As of 2016, the company is valued at about $1 billion, as presented by the New York Times.

In September 2017, Raise raised $60M in Round C funding to expand its mobile payment network.

In late 2018, Raise appointed a new CEO, Jay Klauminzer, a marketplace veteran from Groupon and DoorDash.

Business model 
Raise.com takes a 12% cut from the sale of every gift card.

In the period between funding – in 2014, Raise.com released a mobile app (iOS only) version of its marketplace.

Raise.com also has partnerships with "over a dozen undisclosed retailers so far who are interested in the sorts [of] consumer shopping insights Raise can provide."

Raise has a one-year money back guarantee on purchases made directly through the marketplace.

In 2020, the company also launched two new products based on learnings from their marketplace. Slide, a mobile payments app, offers 4% cash back at hundreds of retailers. Users receive an additional 1% bonus when adding funds to their account (which also speeds checkout). Users select a merchant, enter the amount of spend, and are instantly issued a barcode that can be scanned at the register or typed in online. Slide peaked at #17 on the iOS store in December 2020. rZero is a fraud detection platform that was originally built for Raise to address gift card fraud but is now used widely across fintech and other high risk use cases.

Gift card fraud 
Some users of Raise.com have experienced gift card fraud, typically executed by people who steal items under the return receipt requirements of stores and then requesting gift cards. Generally, customer service regarding fraudulent gift cards receives minimal complaints, and people usually receive a 100%+ refund within the grace period. As AdvisoryHQ states, "Many of the negative Raise reviews on this review site are from buyers who waited until after Raise's 100-day money back guarantee had expired before trying to use their gift card – only to discover that the card was invalid or had a different value than expected."

The company now offers a 365-day money-back guarantee.

While Raise has not publicly commented on this, their terms of service state that any user who attempts to sell an "invalid card" will be subjected to a sale price reversal and may be liable for the 12% sales commission. Additionally, the account holder may be charged a "card refund fee" in the greater amount - $20 or 15% of the gift card sale price.

References

External links 
 

Online marketplaces of the United States
Companies based in Chicago
Privately held companies of the United States